The Louisville, Cincinnati and Lexington Railway was a 19th-century railway company in the U.S. state of Kentucky. It operated from 1877, when it absorbed the failed Louisville, Cincinnati and Lexington Railroad, until 1881, when it was purchased by the Louisville and Nashville network. Its former rights-of-way currently form parts of the class-I CSX Transportation system.

The line was responsible for the establishment of Wilder, Kentucky.

See also

 List of Kentucky railroads

Defunct Kentucky railroads
Defunct companies based in Louisville, Kentucky
Transportation in Louisville, Kentucky
Railway companies established in 1877
Railway companies disestablished in 1881
American companies established in 1877